The Nevada Northern Railway  was a railroad in the U.S. state of Nevada, built primarily to reach a major copper producing area in White Pine County, Nevada.

History

The Nevada Northern owes its beginnings to the discovery and development of large porphyry copper deposits near Ely early in the 20th century.  Two of the region's largest mines (including the Robinson Mine) were purchased in 1902 by Mark Requa, president of the Eureka and Palisade Railroad in central Nevada.

Requa then organized the White Pine Copper Company to develop his new properties, and it soon became evident that rail access to the isolated region would be essential to fully exploit the potential of the mines.  Subsequent surveys indicated that the most practical route for such a railroad was northward from Ely, connecting with the Southern Pacific somewhere in the vicinity of Wells.

The Ely-area copper properties were further merged in 1904, forming the Nevada Consolidated Copper Company, and the Nevada Northern Railway was incorporated on June 1, 1905, to build a line connecting the Nevada Consolidated mines and smelter to the national rail network.  The task of building the new railroad was contracted to the Utah Construction Company, which began work on September 11, 1905.  Construction began at Cobre, where the Nevada Northern connected with the Southern Pacific and proceeded southward.  The line was finished a year later, its completion marked by a two-day celebration in Ely.  The railroad's symbolic final spike—made of local copper—was driven by Requa in Ely on September 29, 1906, which was designated as Railroad Day. To celebrate the new railway, a ball was held inside the Northern building, which was still under construction at the time.

Additional Ely-area trackage was constructed in 1907-1908 to serve the local mining industry.  This trackage, known as the "Ore Line,"  included a route bypassing Ely to the north and continuing west up Robinson Canyon to the copper mines at Ruth.  East of Ely, the Ore Line project saw the construction of the "Hiline," a branch leading to Nevada Consolidated's new copper smelter and concentrator at McGill.  The Ore Line immediately became the busiest segment of the Nevada Northern by far, hosting dozens of loaded and empty ore trains daily.

As a subsidiary of Nevada Consolidated, the primary purpose of the Nevada Northern throughout its history was the haulage of copper ores and products.  Other freight traffic was also carried, and the railroad operated a daily passenger train between East Ely and Cobre until 1941.  Local trains were also operated from Ely to Ruth and McGill for the benefit of mine employees and others until the 1930s, and special school trains carried students to White Pine High School in central Ely.

A series of corporate financial transactions in the 1920s and 1930s brought Nevada Consolidated under the control of the Kennecott Copper Corporation, and Nevada Consolidated was merged into Kennecott in 1942.  The Nevada Northern thus became a Kennecott subsidiary.

Faced with declining ore reserves and low copper prices, Kennecott closed its Ruth-area mines in May 1978, thus ending the ore trains between Ruth and the McGill smelter.  The smelter closed on June 20, 1983, and the Nevada Northern suspended all operations immediately thereafter.

Nevada Northern Railway today

In a series of donations beginning in 1986, Kennecott transferred the entire Ore Line, as well as the railroad's yard and shop facilities in East Ely, to the White Pine Historical Railroad Foundation, a non-profit organization that today operates the property as the Nevada Northern Railway Museum which operates a heritage railroad on this part of the former NN. 

Passenger excursion train service is offered between Ely, Ruth, and McGill using period equipment pulled by historic steam and diesel locomotives.

In April 2006, Nevada's National Historic Landmarks Committee granted unanimous support to nominating the Nevada Northern's East Ely shops complex as a National Historic Landmark.  The nomination was approved by the National Park Service on September 27, 2006.

The remainder of the Nevada Northern has largely been moribund since 1983.  In 1987, the Los Angeles Department of Water and Power purchased the Cobre-East Ely line, in anticipation of the construction of a coal-fired generating plant along the route, which was never constructed.  Meanwhile, the 1990s saw a brief resumption of copper mining near Ruth, this time by Broken Hill Proprietary Company (BHP).  This project saw the construction of additional trackage near Ruth, and the resumption of service from there as far as Shafter by the BHP Nevada Railroad in 1996.  Both the mine and railroad shut down again in 1999, and when mining resumed in 2004 concentrates were hauled by truck rather than by rail.

The disused line between Ely and Cobre was acquired by the city of Ely in 2006.  Plans near 2008 by Sierra Pacific Resources for the construction of the Ely Energy Center, a 2,500 megawatt coal-fired generating plant in the Ely vicinity raised the possibility that the railroad may have seen another revival, carrying inbound loads of coal to White Pine County. Since then those plans have stalled; however, the Nevada Northern Railway Museum and Ely have considered other options to possibly restore the entire mainline route for heritage use. On October 14, 2021, plans to extend the line to McGill were announced.

Locomotive Roster

See also

Nevada Northern Railway Museum

References

Books

Allen, Gary G. "Nevada Northern Sagebrush Short Line." Los Angeles: Trans-Anglo Books, 1964. 
Myrick, David F.  Railroads of Nevada and Eastern California, Vol. 1.  Berkeley:  Howell-North Books, 1962.

Notes

External links

 Nevada Northern Railway Official Site
 Photographs of the Nevada Northern Railway
 Nevada Northern Railway Winter Steam Spectacular Photos
 Photos of The Nevada Northern Railroad

Defunct Nevada railroads
Heritage railroads in Nevada
Ely, Nevada
Former Class I railroads in the United States
Great Basin National Heritage Area
History of White Pine County, Nevada
Transportation in White Pine County, Nevada
Railway companies established in 1905
Railway companies disestablished in 1983
1905 establishments in Nevada
1983 disestablishments in Nevada